In enzymology, a maltose phosphorylase is an enzyme that catalyzes the chemical reaction

maltose + phosphate  D-glucose + beta-D-glucose 1-phosphate

Thus, the two substrates of this enzyme are maltose and phosphate, whereas its two products are D-glucose and beta-D-glucose 1-phosphate.

This enzyme belongs to the family of glycosyltransferases, specifically the hexosyltransferases.  The systematic name of this enzyme class is maltose:phosphate 1-beta-D-glucosyltransferase. This enzyme participates in starch and sucrose metabolism.

Structural studies

As of late 2007, only one structure has been solved for this class of enzymes, with the PDB accession code .

References

 Boyer, P.D., Lardy, H. and Myrback, K. (Eds.), The Enzymes, 2nd ed., vol. 5, Academic Press, New York, 1961, p. 229-236.
 
 
 

EC 2.4.1
Enzymes of known structure